The Benz Bz.IV was a German six-cylinder, water-cooled, inline engine developed for aircraft use. Deliveries began in 1916, and some 6,400 were produced.

Design and development
The Bz.IV was a dual-camshaft design, with two intake and two exhaust valves per cylinder. The cylinders were cast iron surrounded by a sheet metal cooling jacket. The crankcase was aluminium and pistons were initially steel but later versions had aluminium pistons. A high compression version of the engine (Bz IVü) was produced from 1917 onwards and can be recognised by the red bands painted on each cylinder. In February 1918, pistons from a Bz.IV were the first captured aluminium pistons to be examined by the British Ministry of Munitions.

Applications

Specifications

See also

References

 Kroschel, Gunter and Helmust Stützer. (1977) Die deutschen Militarflugzeuge 1910-1918 Wilhelmshaven: Lohse-Eissing Mittler.
  

1910s aircraft piston engines